Michael T. "Mike" Kilmesh is an American politician serving as a member of the Iowa Senate from the 32nd district. Elected in November 2020, he assumed office on January 11, 2021.

Education 
Klimesh graduated from South Winneshiek High School in Calmar, Iowa and earned a Bachelor of Arts degree in political science from Luther College.

Career 
Klimesh served as the mayor of Spillville, Iowa from 2008 to 2020. In 2010 and 2012, he was an unsuccessful candidate for the Iowa House of Representatives. In 2015 and 2016, he worked as a coach at the Northeast Iowa Community College. He was elected to the Iowa Senate in November 2020 and assumed office on January 11, 2021. He also serves as vice chair of the Senate Local Government Committee.

References 

Living people
People from Winneshiek County, Iowa
Luther College (Iowa) alumni
Republican Party Iowa state senators
Year of birth missing (living people)